Emilio Pacione (20 March 1920 – 25 August 2012) was a Scottish footballer who played as a winger best known for playing for Dundee United from 1945 to 1950.

Pacione was born on 20 March 1920. He also played for Lochee Harp, Coleraine and Brechin City.

References

1920 births
2012 deaths
Scottish footballers
Scottish Football League players
Dundee United F.C. players
Coleraine F.C. players
Footballers from Dundee
Association football forwards
Association football wingers
Brechin City F.C. players
Lochee Harp F.C. players